is an original video animation (OVA) anime series co-produced by Tatsunoko Productions and Kyoto Animation. The series lasted for five episodes (six if episode 2.5 that appeared in the middle of the series is included), all of which were released on DVD in North America by ADV Films. A two-episode long sequel OVA series was created, Nurse Witch Komugi-chan Magicarte Z.

The story of the anime is a parody of both The SoulTaker and the magical girl anime genre. It revolves around Komugi Nakahara, a cosplay idol who turns into Magical Nurse Witch Komugi when trouble is around.

While the English dub of the show was adapted by ADV, the original The SoulTaker dub was not. In a rare move, ADV recalled many of the voice actors from The Ocean Group dub of The SoulTaker to reprise their roles in Nurse Witch Komugi to keep consistency between the two dubs.

An anime television series Nurse Witch Komugi-chan R aired from January 10, 2016 to March 27, 2016. The new series is a reboot of the original OVAs.

Characters
All but a few characters return from The SoulTaker, appearing as bizarre parodies of themselves.

Voiced By: Haruko Momoi (Japanese), Jocelyne Loewen (English)
The main character, a seventeen-year-old cosplayer, who transforms into Nurse Witch Komugi. She works for a talent agency called Kiri Pro, where she acts and endorses products (usually while wearing silly costumes). She can be very hyper and silly, which usually gets her into trouble with her bosses. Her nurse witch costume resembles a cross between a nurse uniform and a rabbit costume.

 Voiced By: Yuji Ueda (Japanese), Luci Christian (English)
Komugi's 'side-kick', a perverted rabbit-like creature from Vaccine World who detects viruses.

 Voiced By: Mitsuki Saiga (Japanese), Brad Swaile (English)
A famous singer, working for Kiri Pro's rival company. He is also Komugi's romantic love interest, sweetheart, and crush. In SoulTaker, he was the protagonist of the series on a search for his long-lost twin sister Runa, along the way discovering his own abilities as a mutant byproduct of the Beta Applicon Project.

 Voiced By: Ikue Otani (Japanese), Kira Vincent-Davis (English)
Koyori is a friend of Komugi and works with her as a model and cosplayer. However, from time to time, Koyori will lose consciousness and transform into Magical Maid Koyori, her evil form. Koyori will then infect innocent people with viruses. She could be considered Komugi's rival. She often gets frustrated at being constantly defeated by Komugi and Mugimaru. After a time, she will revert to her good form again with no memory of anything she did in her evil form.

 Voiced By: Ai Shimizu (Japanese), Monica Rial (English)
Magical Maid Koyori's 'side-kick', a quiet raccoon. In Episode 4, Magical Maid spends months training Posokichi to speak.

 Voiced By: Akiko Hiramatsu (Japanese), Lisa Ann Beley (English)
Ms. Yui is the president of Kiri Pro. She often scolds Komugi when she messes up (which is quite often). She is 29 years old, and once was a well-known and famous idol, and she fell in love with a president from another talent agency, Mr. Richard. Everything was going well for her, until Richard announced to the press that he was in love with Ms. Yui's manager on the same day Ms. Yui was going to announce her engagement to Richard. She was heart broken and humiliated, so she quit the idol business and became the president of her own talent agency.

 Voiced By: Masaya Onosaka (Japanese), Trevor Devall (English)
Shiro is Komugi's manager. He usually has a laid-back, relaxed personality, but when Komugi skips out on her job (usually to become Magical Nurse and save the city), then it is best to not cross his path. He also will get stuck with Komugi's job until she returns, usually wearing one of her costumes. Although he yells at Komugi, he sticks up for her when Ms. Yui scolds her for her disappearances and mess-ups. He has an assortment of nicknames for Komugi, including "Little Shit" or "Little piss-ant girl" (English translation). It is also been shown that he works well with computers, for he designed and manages Komugi's personal fan site for her.

 Voiced By: Atsuko Enomoto (Japanese), Jessica Boone (English)
Megumi also works at Kiri Pro, and is Komugi's bitter rival. Megumi, unlike Komugi, has much sex appeal, and she is often the one to tease Komugi about her flat chest, to which Komugi retorts with an insult such as "Hooter's Girl" to insult her enormous chest. Megumi is an image girl, posing for center folds and posters, although she also has an interest in acting.

Voiced By: Michiko Neya (Japanese), Cynthia Martinez (English)
Runa is a child star at Kiri Pro. She normally seems calm and cute, but she occasionally makes rude comments, usually about Komugi. She, like Megumi, calls Komugi a flat-chest and a pseudo-Idol. She takes advantage of her cute appearance to earn more money. In SoulTaker she is the twin sister of Kyosuke Tokisaka ("Date") who was constantly being hunted down by the remaining members of the Tokisaka Clan and the Kirhara hospital. Like Kyosuke, she is a strong mutant.

 Voiced By: Yukari Tamura (Japanese), Shelley Calene-Black (English)
Asuka was once a movie actress, but was demoted to Kiri Pro. Komugi thinks it is an honor to have a professional actor working with her, but in reality it means Asuka is close to losing her job as an actress. Asuka works hard at her job at Kiri Pro, and is usually more responsible than Komugi or Megumi. She doesn't complain much, but can lose her temper just as well as the others. Unlike the other Kiri Pro employees, Asuka respects Komugi and forms a friendship with her. In Magikarte Z, it is revealed that Asuka hates Osaka with quite a passion.

 Voiced By: Ikue Otani (Japanese), Christine Auten (English)
Maya is the goddess of Vaccine World who sent Mugi-maru to earth to find a human (Komugi Nakahara) to carry the magic baton and defeat Ungrar.

Episodes

Nurse Witch Komugi-chan Magikarte Z

Music
Opening Theme
Ai no Medicine by Haruko Momoi
Shooting Star by Haruko Momoi (Magikarte Z)
Ready Go!! by Magical R (Kei Tomoe, Erii Yamazaki, Makoto Koichi)
Ending Theme
Ame to Namida to Otome to Taiyaki by Otome Shinto

References

Further reading

External links
Official anime website 

2002 anime OVAs
2003 anime OVAs
2003 manga
2004 anime OVAs
ADV Films
Anime spin-offs
Fictional characters who use magic
Witch Komugi, Nurse
Hakusensha manga
Kemonomimi
MF Bunko J
Magical girl anime and manga
NBCUniversal Entertainment Japan
Parody anime and manga
PlayStation 2 games
Seinen manga
Sentai Filmworks
Magical girl parodies